Xin'an Xianzhi (literally Gazetteers of Xin'an County) were the chorography of the historical Xin'an County (San-On or Sun-On County; literally New Peace County; known at times as the Po-On County (spelt Bao'an in pinyin)) of Guangdong (then Kwangtung) in southern China.

A few editions existed. The last editions were Qing's Kangxi Years (K'ang-hsi; 1661–1722) edition and Jiaqing Years (Chia-ch'ing; 1796–1820) edition.

See also
 Gazetteer

Further reading
 

History of Guangdong
History of Hong Kong
History of Shenzhen
Gazetteers